Janet Park Cooke (née Shackleton; 10 July 1928 – 17 May 2021) was a New Zealand hurdler. At the 1950 British Empire Games, as Janet Shackleton, she won the bronze medal in the 80 metres hurdles.

In 1953, she married John Humphrey Cooke at Waimate, and the couple went on to have four children. In the late 1950s, they purchased the  Big Ben Station near the Rakaia Gorge, where they farmed sheep and cattle. In 1991, Janet and John Cooke retired to Akaroa, before moving to Greenpark near Lincoln, and then Wellington, where John Cooke died in 2013. Janet Cooke died in Wellington on 17 May 2021.

References

1928 births
2021 deaths
People from Waimate
New Zealand female hurdlers
Commonwealth Games bronze medallists for New Zealand
Commonwealth Games medallists in athletics
Athletes (track and field) at the 1950 British Empire Games
Sportspeople from Canterbury, New Zealand
Medallists at the 1950 British Empire Games